Vidyut may refer to
Vidyut (given name)
Vidyut-class missile boat of Indian Navy
INS Vidyut (disambiguation) – several ships
Delhi Vidyut Board in India
Uttar Pradesh Rajya Vidyut Utpadan Nigam, Indian electric-power company